The 105th district of the Texas House of Representatives consists of the majority of the city of Irving, in Dallas County The current Representative is Terry Meza, who has represented the district since 2019.

The district contains the eastern half of DFW International Airport.

References 

105